Gilbert Charles Stuart ( Stewart; December 3, 1755 – July 9, 1828) was an American painter from Rhode Island Colony who is widely considered one of America's foremost portraitists. His best-known work is an unfinished portrait of George Washington, begun in 1796, which is sometimes referred to as the Athenaeum Portrait. Stuart retained the portrait and used it to paint scores of copies that were commissioned by patrons in America and abroad. The image of George Washington featured in the painting has appeared on the United States one-dollar bill for more than a century and on various postage stamps of the 19th century and early 20th century.

Stuart produced portraits of more than 1,000 people, including the first six Presidents.  His work can be found today at art museums throughout the United States and the United Kingdom, including the Metropolitan Museum of Art and Frick Collection in New York City, the National Gallery of Art in Washington, D.C., the Philadelphia Museum of Art in Philadelphia, the National Portrait Gallery in London, Worcester Art Museum in Worcester, Massachusetts, and the Boston Museum of Fine Arts.

Biography

Early life

Stuart was born on December 3, 1755, in Saunderstown, a village of North Kingstown in the Colony of Rhode Island and Providence Plantations, and he was baptized at Old Narragansett Church on April 11, 1756. He was the third child of Gilbert Stuart, a Scottish immigrant employed in the snuff-making industry, and Elizabeth Anthony Stuart, a member of a prominent land-owning family from Middletown, Rhode Island. Stuart's father owned the first snuff mill in America, which was located in the basement of the family homestead.

Stuart moved to Newport, Rhode Island at the age of six, where his father pursued work in the merchant field. In Newport, he first began to show great promise as a painter.  In 1770, he made the acquaintance of Scottish artist Cosmo Alexander, a visitor to the colonies who made portraits of local patrons and who became a tutor to Stuart. Under the guidance of Alexander, Stuart painted the portrait Dr. Hunter's Spaniels when he was 14; it hangs today in the Hunter House Mansion in Newport.

In 1771, Stuart moved to Scotland with Alexander to finish his studies; however,  Alexander died in Edinburgh one year later. Stuart tried to maintain a living and pursue his painting career, but to no avail, so he returned to Newport in 1773.

England and Ireland

Stuart's prospects as a portraitist were jeopardized by the onset of the American Revolution and its social disruptions. Although he was a patriot, he departed for England in 1775 following the example set by John Singleton Copley. His painting style during this period began to develop beyond the relatively hard-edged and linear style that he had learned from Alexander. He was unsuccessful at first in pursuit of his vocation, but he became a protégé of Benjamin West in 1777 and studied with him for the next six years. The relationship was beneficial, with Stuart exhibiting for the first time at the Royal Academy in spring of 1777.

By 1782, Stuart had met with success, largely due to acclaim for The Skater, a portrait of Sir William Grant. It was Stuart's first full-length portrait and, according to art historian Margaret C. S. Christman, it "belied the prevailing opinion that Stuart 'made a tolerable likeness of a face, but as to the figure, he could not get below the fifth button'". Stuart said that he was "suddenly lifted into fame by a single picture".

The prices for his pictures were exceeded only by those of renowned English artists Joshua Reynolds and Thomas Gainsborough. Despite his many commissions, however, he was habitually neglectful of finances and was in danger of being sent to debtors' prison. In 1787, he fled to Dublin, Ireland where he painted and accumulated debt with equal vigor.

New York City and Philadelphia
Stuart ended his 18-year stay in Britain and Ireland in 1793, leaving behind numerous unfinished paintings. He returned to the United States with a particular goal of painting a portrait of George Washington and having an engraver reproduce it and provide for his family through the engraving's sale. He settled briefly in New York City and pursued portrait commissions from influential people who could bring him to Washington's attention. In 1794, he painted statesman John Jay, from whom he received a letter of introduction to Washington. In 1795, Stuart moved to the Germantown section of Philadelphia, where he opened a studio, and Washington posed for him later that year.

Stuart painted Washington in a series of iconic portraits, each of them leading to a demand for copies and keeping him busy and highly paid for years. The most famous and celebrated of these likenesses is known as The Athenaeum and is portrayed on the United States one-dollar bill. Stuart painted about 75 reproductions of The Athenaeum. However, he never completed the original version; after finishing Washington's face, he kept the original version to make the copies. He sold up to 70 of his reproductions for a price of $100 each, but the original portrait was left unfinished at the time of his death in 1828. The painting was jointly purchased by the National Portrait Gallery and Museum of Fine Arts, Boston in 1980, and is generally on display in the National Portrait Gallery.

Another celebrated image of Washington is the Lansdowne portrait, a large portrait with one version hanging in the East Room of the White House. This painting was rescued during the Burning of Washington in the War of 1812 thanks to the efforts of First Lady Dolley Madison and Paul Jennings, one of President James Madison's slaves. Four versions of the portrait are attributed to Stuart, and additional copies were painted by other artists for display in U.S. government buildings. In 1803, Stuart opened a studio in Washington, D. C.

Boston, 1805–1828

Stuart moved to Devonshire Street in Boston in 1805, continuing in both critical acclaim and financial troubles. He exhibited works locally at Doggett's Repository and Julien Hall. He was sought out for advice by other artists, such as John Trumbull, Thomas Sully, Washington Allston, and John Vanderlyn.

Personal life
Stuart married Charlotte Coates around September 1786; she was 13 years his junior and "exceedingly pretty". They had 12 children, five of whom died by 1815 and two others died while they were young. Their daughter Jane (1812–1888) was also a painter. She sold many of his paintings and her replicas of them from her studios in Boston and Newport, Rhode Island. In 2011, she was inducted into the Rhode Island Heritage Hall of Fame.

In 1824, Stuart suffered a stroke which left him partially paralyzed, but he continued to paint for two years until his death in Boston on July 9, 1828, at 72. He was buried in the Central Burial Ground at Boston Common.

Stuart left his family deeply in debt, and his wife and daughters were unable to purchase a grave site. He was, therefore, buried in an unmarked grave which was purchased cheaply from Benjamin Howland, a local carpenter. His family recovered from their financial troubles 10 years later, and they planned to move his body to a family cemetery in Newport. However, they could not remember the exact location of his body, and it was never moved. There is a monument for Stuart, his wife, and their children at the Common Burying Ground in Newport.

The Boston Athenæum held a benefit exhibition of Stuart's works in August 1828 in an effort to provide financial aid for his family. More than 250 portraits were lent for this critically acclaimed and well-subscribed exhibition. This also marked the first public showing of his unfinished 1796 Athenæum Head portrait of Washington.

Legacy

By the end of his career, Gilbert Stuart had painted the likenesses of more than 1,000 American political and social figures. He was praised for the vitality and naturalness of his portraits, and his subjects found his company agreeable. John Adams said:

Stuart was known for working without the aid of sketches, beginning directly upon the canvas, which was very unusual for the time period. His approach is suggested by the advice which he gave to his pupil Matthew Harris Jouett: "Never be sparing of colour, load your pictures, but keep your colours as separate as you can. No blending, tis destruction to clear & bea[u]tiful effect."

John Henri Isaac Browere created a life mask of Stuart around 1825. In 1940, the U.S. Post Office issued a series of postage stamps called the "Famous Americans Series" commemorating famous artists, authors, inventors, scientists, poets, educators, and musicians.  Gilbert Stuart is found on the 1 cent issue in the artists category, along with James McNeill Whistler, Augustus Saint-Gaudens, Daniel Chester French, and Frederic Remington.

Today, Stuart's birthplace in Saunderstown, Rhode Island is open to the public as the Gilbert Stuart Birthplace and Museum. The museum consists of the original house where he was born, with copies of his paintings hanging throughout the house. The museum opened in 1930.

Gilbert Stuart's paintings of Washington, Jefferson, and others have served as models for dozens of U.S. postage stamps.  Washington's image from the famous portrait The Athenaeum is probably the most noted example of Stuart's work on postage.

Notable people painted

This is a partial list of portraits painted by Stuart.
 Abigail Adams – Second First Lady of the United States, wife of John Adams
 John Adams – Second President of the United States
 John Quincy Adams – Sixth President of the United States
 Charles Humphrey Atherton - United States Representative from New Hampshire from 1815 to 1817
 John Jacob Astor – First American multi-millionaire, fur trader, art patron
 John Bannister – Owner of Bannister's Wharf in Newport, Rhode Island
 Commodore John Barry – Father of the American Navy
 Commodore Oliver Hazard Perry – Hero of the Battle of Lake Erie in 1814.
 Ann Willing Bingham – Philadelphia socialite
 Horace Binney – Prominent Philadelphia lawyer
 Elizabeth Bowdoin, Lady Temple – wife of Sir John Temple, first British consul general to United States, 1785
 Hugh Henry Brackenridge – early American writer, Pennsylvania Supreme Court justice, and founder of the University of Pittsburgh
 Jean Baptiste Casmiere Breschard – Performer and theatrical impresario
 Rosalie Stier Calvert – Belgian-born heiress and mother of Charles Benedict Calvert
 Mary Willing Clymer – Philadelphia socialite
 John Singleton Copley – American colonial portraitist
 Thomas Dawes - Early American architect, builder, military leader, politician
 Horatio Gates – American Revolutionary War general
 King George III – King of United Kingdom of Great Britain and Ireland, 1760–1820
 King George IV – King of United Kingdom of Great Britain and Ireland, 1820–30
 John Jay – First Chief Justice of the United States Supreme Court
 Thomas Jefferson – Third President of the United States
 Rufus King – a signer of United States Constitution
 Robert Kingsmill – Admiral in Royal Navy during American and French Revolutionary Wars
 King Louis XVI – King of France, 1774–92
 James Madison – Fourth President of the United States
 Samuel Miles – Revolutionary War General and Philadelphia mayor
 James Monroe – Fifth President of the United States
 Daniel Pinckney Parker – Prominent Boston merchant
 John Randolph of Roanoke – Virginia congressman and senator
 Joshua Reynolds – English artist
 Henry Rice – Boston merchant and Massachusetts state legislator
 John Tayloe III – Virginia planter, builder of The Octagon House in Washington, DC.
 Thomas Townshend, 1st Viscount Sydney – the cities of Sydney in New South Wales and Sydney, Nova Scotia are named in his honor
 John Trumbull – artist during the period of the American Revolutionary War
 George Washington – First President of the United States
 Martha Washington – First Lady of the United States, wife of George Washington
 Benjamin West – American painter
 Catherine Brass Yates – Philadelphia socialite
 John Bill Ricketts – Equestrian, leader of Ricketts' Circus in Philadelphia
Elisabeth Merry - Wife of Anthony Merry 1805.

Portrait gallery

References

Bibliography
 
 
 
Park, Lawrence, John Hill Morgan, and Royal Cortissoz (1926). Gilbert Stuart : An Illustrated Descriptive List of His Works. New York: W. E. Rudge.

External links

 Gilbert Stuart at the National Gallery of Art, Washington
 Gilbert Stuart Biography, National Gallery of Art
 Gilbert Stuart Museum Website
 Gilbert-Stuart.org 155 works by Gilbert Stuart
 Gilbert Stuart on ArtCyclopedia
 Union List of Artist Names, Getty Vocabularies. ULAN Full Record Display for Gilbert Stuart. Getty Vocabulary Program, Getty Research Institute. Los Angeles, California.
 Gilbert Stuart, a full text exhibition catalog from The Metropolitan Museum of Art

 

1755 births
1828 deaths
18th-century American painters
18th-century American male artists
American male painters
19th-century American painters
American people of Scottish descent
American portrait painters
Burials in Boston
Hall of Fame for Great Americans inductees
Painters from Rhode Island
People from North Kingstown, Rhode Island
People of colonial Rhode Island
19th-century American male artists